Central News Agency may refer to:

 Central News Agency (London), a news agency active in Victorian London
 Central News Agency (Taiwan), the state news agency of Taiwan
 CNA (bookstore), a South African book store chain
 Central News Agency Literary Award
 Korean Central News Agency, the state news agency of North Korea

See also 
 CNA (disambiguation)